Wong Chuk Kok Tsui, formerly known as Bluff Head, is a cape in north east New Territories, Hong Kong. Administratively, it is part of North District and Tai Po District.

Geography
Wong Chuk Kok Tsui separates North Channel, the northern part of Tolo Channel, to its south and Wong Chuk Kok Hoi to its north. It is reputated as the extremity of north east New Territories, due to its remoteness for access on land.

Conservation
It is part of Plover Cove Country Park and the Hong Kong National Geopark. It holds some of the oldest rocks in Hong Kong.

External links

 Oldest rock in Hong Kong － Wong Chuk Kok Tsui

Capes of Hong Kong
North District, Hong Kong
Tai Po District
Hong Kong UNESCO Global Geopark